Marie Mijalis (born February 1, 1981 in Shreveport, Louisiana) is an American sprint canoer who competed in the mid-2000s. At the 2004 Summer Olympics, she was eliminated in the semifinals of the K-4 500 m event.

References
 Sports-Reference.com profile

1981 births
American female canoeists
Canoeists at the 2004 Summer Olympics
Living people
Olympic canoeists of the United States
Sportspeople from Shreveport, Louisiana
21st-century American women